Sebastopolis may refer to:
 Sebastopolis in Caria, a town of ancient Caria, now in Turkey
 Sebastopolis in Colchis, a former name of Sukhumi, Georgia
 Sebastopolis in Mysia, a former name of Sandarlik, Turkey
 Sebastopolis in Pontus or in Armenia, a former name of Sulusaray, Turkey
 Sebastopolis in Thrace, a former city in Turkey
 Sevastopol, a city in Crimea

See also 
 Sebaste (disambiguation) (several cities & episcopal sees)
 Sebastopol (disambiguation)
 Sevastopol (disambiguation)